Pranami is a sect which worships the words of the Supreme God, Shri Krishna, which was given through Mahamati Prannathji and Satguru Shri Devchandraji as their holy book, Shri Tartam Sagar.

History 

The Pranami sampradaya emerged in the 17th century in Western India, based on the teachings of Bhakti saints, Sri Devchandraji Maharaj and his foremost disciple Sri Mehraj Thakur (also known as Mahamati Prannathji or Prananathji, which gives this tradition the name). The Pranami Sampradaya is also known as the Nijananda Sampradaya, literally, 'nij' meaning, oneself or own and 'ananda' meaning bliss or joy.  The Pranami sampradaya's teachings tries to bridge the gap between the Eastern religions and Western religions together stating that both the Eastern and Western religions talk about the same one almighty god. 

The traditions grew after Mughal Empire declined, in the wake of Aurangzeb's religious persecution of non-Muslims, when Hindu rebellion led to new kingdoms. King Chhatrasal of one such kingdom of Bundelkhand patronized Mahamati Prannathji. The Pranami tradition welcomed all castes and religions to join the Supreme Truth Shri Krishna worship tradition. At conversion initiation, Prannathji would invite the new members to dine together regardless of whether they came from any Sanatan background. He would also explain the Pranami ideas by citing Hindu and Islamic texts to make his teachings connect with the background of the converts.

The religious center of the Pranami tradition has been in northeast Madhya Pradesh, in the town of Panna. In the contemporary era, other major Pranami religious centers (gaddi) are in Jamnagar (Gujarat), Surat(Gujarat) and Phuguwa (south of Kathmandu, Nepal). Every year, there is a anniversary celebration of their founder, Prannathji. This happens around the time in January and the whole town of Panna attracts devotees from around the world including those from the US. Almost an entire month is dedicated to devotional songs and sacred activities. Around this time local tourism also gets boosted, as this area located in Bundelkhand is one of the most economically underdeveloped regions. The Pranami pilgrimage brings much-needed economic relief, although this place also has other very popular Hindu temples, the most famous being the Juggal Kishore. 

The Pranami worship Shri Krishna as the Supreme Truth God, and they believe in one and only god. Its Hindu includes just the texts. Its theology is contained in 14 religious texts attributed to Prannathji, which is known as Shri Tartam Sagar.  The 14 compositions contain 18,758 chaupai (verses), and is called Tartam Sagar. It is, like in other Bhakti movement saint traditions, an eclectic mix of vernacular languages found in central, west and north India: Hindi, Gujarati, Sindhi and Sanskrit. The Pranami devotees believe that Prannathji taught with his text, the essence of all major religious texts of the world, including the Vedas, the Bhagawat Geeta, Quran and the Bible. Most of the devotees believe in no religion but one god and some of them call themselves Hindu but willingly accept teachings found in other sources and texts.

Traditions 

The tradition is strictly vegetarian (ahimsa, non-violence to animals), non-caste tradition dedicated to Supreme Lord whom they also call as "Rajji". Dedicated Pranami temples exist such as in Kathiawar and Gulf of Kutch region, but followers of Pranami traditions substitute it by praying and spiritual pursuits in any nearby convenient temples. There are an estimated 5-10 million Pranamis found primarily throughout North India, particularly the states of Gujarat, Rajasthan, Punjab, Madhya Pradesh, Haryana, Uttar Pradesh, West Bengal (Darjeeling , Kalimpong and Sikkim), and Assam, as well as the eastern half of Nepal.

Mahatma Gandhi's mother was a pious Pranami Hindu.
In this religion there is no such absolute statue of the god, as they don't believe in Idol Worship, only Shri Tartam Sagar, the divine knowledge is worshiped. Gandhi in his book My Experiments With Truth mentions about this sampradaya:  "Pranami is a sect deriving the best of both Quran and Gita, in search of one goal, and one god — Supreme Lord Shri Krishna."

See also

 Bhakti movement
 Chhatrasal
 Pranami Sampraday

References

Further reading

External links
 
 
 

Hindu denominations
Krishnaite Vaishnava denominations
Bhakti movement
Anti-caste movements
Religions that require vegetarianism
Religious syncretism in Asia
17th-century establishments in India